The Spanish Tragedy, or Hieronimo is Mad Again is an Elizabethan tragedy written by Thomas Kyd between 1582 and 1592. Highly popular and influential in its time, The Spanish Tragedy established a new genre in English theatre, the revenge play or revenge tragedy. The play contains several violent murders and includes as one of its characters a personification of Revenge. The Spanish Tragedy is often considered to be the first mature Elizabethan drama, a claim disputed with Christopher Marlowe's Tamburlaine, and was parodied by many Elizabethan and Jacobean playwrights, including Marlowe, William Shakespeare and Ben Jonson.

Many elements of The Spanish Tragedy, such as the play-within-a-play used to trap a murderer and a ghost intent on vengeance, appear in Shakespeare's Hamlet. (Thomas Kyd is frequently proposed as the author of the hypothetical Ur-Hamlet that may have been one of Shakespeare's primary sources for Hamlet.)

Performance

Early performances 
Lord Strange's Men staged a play that the records call Jeronimo on 23 February 1592 at The Rose for Philip Henslowe, and repeated it sixteen times to 22 January 1593. It is unlikely, however, that the performance in February 1592 was the play's first performance, as Henslowe did not mark it as 'ne' (new). It is unclear whether Jeronimo was The Spanish Tragedy, or The First Part of Hieronimo (printed in 1604), the anonymous "prequel" to Kyd's play, or perhaps either on different days.

The Admiral's Men revived Kyd's original on 7 January 1597, and performed it twelve times to 19 July; they staged another performance conjointly with Pembroke's Men on 11 October of the same year. The records of Philip Henslowe suggest that the play was on stage again in 1601 and 1602. English actors performed the play on tour in Germany (1601), and both German and Dutch adaptations were made.

Modern performances 
The Spanish Tragedy was performed at London's National Theatre, first in 1982 at the Cottesloe Theatre, with Michael Bryant in the role of Hieronimo, directed by Michael Bogdanov. It transferred to the Lyttelton Theatre in 1984.

The Royal Shakespeare Company performed The Spanish Tragedy in May 1997 at the Swan Theatre, directed by Michael Boyd. The cast included Siobhan Redmond as Bel-imperia, Robert Glenister as Lorenzo, Peter Wright as Hieronimo, Jeffry Wickham as the King of Spain. The production later transferred to The Pit at London's Barbican in November 1997.

An amateur production of The Spanish Tragedy was performed 2–6 June 2009 by students from Oxford University, in the second quad of Oriel College, Oxford. Another amateur production was presented by the Hyperion Shakespeare Company 21–30 October 2010 with students from Harvard University in Harvard's New College Theatre. In November 2012, Perchance Theatre in association with Cambridge University's Marlowe Society staged a site-specific production in King's College Chapel, Cambridge. In October/November 2013, the Baron's Men of Austin, TX performed the work in a near-uncut state, with period costumes and effects, at Richard Garriott's Curtain Theater, a mini replica of the Globe Theater. Another amateur production was presented by the Experimental Theater Board of Carleton College 27–29 May 2015.

Other professional performances include a modern-dress production staged at the Arcola Theatre in London in October–November 2009, directed by Mitchell Moreno, with Dominic Rowan as Hieronimo, as well as a production in Belle Époque era costume, staged by Theatre Pro Rata in Minneapolis in March 2010, directed by Carin Bratlie.

The play has never been filmed or staged on television.

Publication
In the "Induction" to his play Bartholomew Fair (1614), Ben Jonson alludes to The Spanish Tragedy as being "five and twenty or thirty years" old. If taken literally, this would yield a date range of 1584–1589, a range that agrees with what else is known about the play. The exact date of composition is unknown, though it is speculated that it was written sometime between 1583 and 1591. Most evidence points to a completion date before 1588, noting that the play makes no reference to the Spanish Armada, and because of possible allusions to the play in Nashe's Preface to Greene's Menaphon from 1589 and The Anatomie of Absurdity from 1588–1589. Due to this evidence, the year 1587 remains the most likely year for completion of the play.

Kyd's play was entered into the Stationers' Register on 6 October 1592 by the bookseller Abel Jeffes. The play was published in an undated quarto, almost certainly before the end of 1592; this first quarto was printed by Edward Allde—and published not by the copyright holder Jeffes, but by another bookseller, Edward White. On 18 December that year, the Stationers Company ruled that both Jeffes and White had broken the guild's rules by printing works that belonged to the other; both men were fined 10 shillings, and the offending books were destroyed so that Q1 of The Spanish Tragedy survives in only a single copy. Yet the Q1 title page refers to an even earlier edition; this was probably by Jeffes, and no known copy exists.

The popular play was reprinted in 1594. In an apparent compromise between the competing booksellers, the title page of Q2 credits the edition to "Abell Jeffes, to be sold by Edward White". On 13 August 1599, Jeffes transferred his copyright to William White, who issued the third edition that year. White in turn transferred the copyright to Thomas Pavier on 14 August 1600 and Pavier issued the fourth edition (printed for him by William White) in 1602. This 1602 Q4 contains five additions to the preexisting text. Q4 was reprinted in 1610, 1615 (two issues), 1618, 1623 (two issues), and 1633.

Authorship
All of the early editions are anonymous. The first indication that the author of the play was Kyd was in 1773 when Thomas Hawkins, the editor of a three-volume play-collection, cited a brief quotation from The Spanish Tragedy in Thomas Heywood's Apology for Actors (1612), which Heywood attributes to "M. Kid". The style of The Spanish Tragedy is considered such a good match with Kyd's style in his other extant play, Cornelia (1593), that scholars and critics have universally recognised Kyd's authorship.

In 2013, scholar Douglas Bruster theorised that some awkward wordings in the "Additional Passages" of the 1602 fourth edition resulted from printers' errors in setting type from the (now lost) original manuscript. Furthermore, after examining the "Hand D" manuscript (widely accepted as in Shakespeare's handwriting) from the play Sir Thomas More, Bruster opined that the speculated printers' errors could have resulted from reading a manuscript written by someone with Shakespeare's "messy" handwriting, thus bolstering the likelihood that Shakespeare wrote the Additional Passages.

Characters

Figures in the Frame
 The ghost of Don Andrea
 An embodiment of Revenge

Spain
 The Spanish King
 Don Cyprian, Duke of Castile, the King's brother
 Don Lorenzo, the Duke of Castile's son
 Bel-imperia, the Duke of Castile's daughter
 Pedringano, Bel-imperia's servant
 Christophil, Don Lorenzo's servant
 Don Lorenzo's page boy
 Don Hieronimo, Knight Marshal of Spain
 Isabella, his wife
 Don Horatio, their son
 A servant to Don Hieronimo
 A maid to Isabella
 Don Bazulto, an elderly man
 General of the Spanish army
 Three watchmen
 A deputy
 A hangman
 A messenger
 Three citizens

Portugal
 The Portuguese Viceroy
 Prince Balthazar, his son
 Don Pedro, the Viceroy's brother
 Alexandro and Villuppo, Portuguese noblemen
 The Portuguese Ambassador
 Serberine, Balthazar's serving-man
 Two noblemen of Portugal
 Two Portuguese citizens (Portingales)

In Hieronimo's play
 Soliman, Sultan of Turkey (played by Balthazar)
 Erasto ("Erastus"), Knight of Rhodes (played by Lorenzo)
 Bashaw (played by Hieronimo)
 Perseda (played by Bel-imperia)

Plot
Before the play begins, the Viceroy of Portugal rebelled against Spanish rule. A battle took place in which the Portuguese were defeated and their leader, the Viceroy's son Balthazar, killed the Spanish officer Andrea before being taken captive by the Spanish. Andrea's ghost and the personification Revenge itself are present onstage throughout the entirety of the play and serve as chorus. At the end of each act, Andrea bemoans the series of injustices that have taken place and then Revenge reassures him that those deserving will get their comeuppance. The Ghost of Andrea and Revenge open the play in Act 1 and close the play in Act 5 with descriptions of the Classical underworld. There is also a subplot concerning the enmity of two Portuguese noblemen, one of whom attempts to convince the Viceroy that his rival has murdered the missing Balthazar.

The King's nephew Lorenzo and Andrea's best friend Horatio dispute over who captured Balthazar. Though it is made clear early on that Horatio defeated Balthazar and Lorenzo has essentially cheated his way into taking partial credit, the King leaves Balthazar in Lorenzo's charge and splits the spoils of the victory between the two. Horatio comforts Lorenzo's sister, Bel-imperia, who was in love with Andrea against her family's wishes. Despite her former feelings for Andrea, Bel-imperia soon falls for Horatio. She confesses that her love for Horatio is motivated partially by her desire for revenge: Bel-imperia intends to torment Balthazar, who killed her former lover Andrea.

Meanwhile, Balthazar is falling in love with Bel-imperia. The Spanish king decides that a marriage between Balthazar and Bel-imperia would be an excellent way to repair the peace with Portugal. Horatio's father, the Marshal Hieronimo, stages an entertainment for the Portuguese ambassador. Lorenzo, suspecting that Bel-imperia has found a new lover, bribes her servant Pedringano and discovers that Horatio is the man. He persuades Balthazar to help him murder Horatio during an assignation with Bel-imperia. Hieronimo and his wife Isabella find the body of their son hanged and stabbed, and Isabella is driven mad. (Revisions made to the original play supplement the scene with Hieronimo briefly losing his wits as well.)

Lorenzo locks Bel-imperia away, but she succeeds in sending Hieronimo a letter, written in her own blood, informing him that Lorenzo and Balthazar were Horatio's murderers. Hieronimo's questions and attempts to see Bel-imperia convince Lorenzo that he knows something. Afraid that Balthazar's servant Serberine has revealed the truth, Lorenzo convinces Pedringano to murder Serberine, then arranges for Pedringano's arrest in the hopes of silencing him too. Hieronimo, appointed judge, sentences Pedringano to death. Pedringano expects Lorenzo to procure his pardon, and Lorenzo, having written a fake letter of pardon, lets him believe this right up until the hangman drops Pedringano to his death.

Lorenzo manages to prevent Hieronimo from seeking justice by convincing the King that Horatio is alive and well. Furthermore, Lorenzo does not allow Hieronimo to see the King, claiming that he is too busy. This, combined with his wife Isabella's suicide, pushes Hieronimo past his limit. He rants incoherently and digs at the ground with his dagger. Lorenzo goes on to tell his uncle, the King, that Hieronimo's odd behaviour is due to his inability to deal with his son Horatio's newfound wealth (Balthazar's ransom from the Portuguese Viceroy), and he has gone mad with jealousy. Regaining his senses, Hieronimo, along with Bel-imperia, feigns reconciliation with the murderers, and asks them to join him in putting on a play, Soliman and Perseda, to entertain the court.

When the play is performed, Hieronimo uses real daggers instead of prop daggers, so that Lorenzo and Balthazar are stabbed to death in front of the King, Viceroy, and Duke (Lorenzo and Bel-imperia's father). He cast the play in such a way that both himself and Bel-imperia could exact their own revenge by actually killing the murderers. Bel-imperia chooses to stab herself during the play too, although this was not Hieronimo's intention for her.
Hieronimo tells everyone of the motive behind the murders, bites out his own tongue to prevent himself from talking under torture, and kills the Duke of Castille and then himself. Andrea and Revenge are satisfied, and promise to deliver suitable eternal punishments to the guilty parties.

Influences
Many writers influenced The Spanish Tragedy, notably Seneca and those from the Medieval tradition. The play is ostensibly Senecan with its bloody tragedy, rhetoric of the horrible, the character of the Ghost and typical revenge themes. The characters of the Ghost of Andrea and Revenge form a chorus similar to that of Tantalus and Fury in Seneca's Thyestes. The Ghost describes his journey into the underworld and calls for punishment at the end of the play that has influences from Thyestes, Agamemnon and Phaedra. The use of onomastic rhetoric is also Senecan, with characters playing upon their names, as Hieronimo does repeatedly. Hieronimo also references the Senecan plays, Agamemnon and Troades, in his monologue in Act 3, scene 13. The character of the Old Man, Senex, is seen as a direct reference to Seneca.

The play also subverts typically Senecan qualities such as the use of a ghost character. For Kyd, the Ghost is part of the chorus, unlike in Thyestes where the Ghost leaves after the prologue. Also, the Ghost is not a functioning prologue as he does not give the audience information about the major action on stage nor its conclusion. The Ghost is similar to those in metrical medieval plays who return from the dead to talk about their downfall and offer commentary on the action. Revenge is akin to a medieval character that acts as a guide for those on a journey.

Allusions
The Spanish Tragedy was enormously influential, and references and allusions to it abound in the literature of its era. Ben Jonson mentions "Hieronimo" in the Induction to his Cynthia's Revels (1600), has a character disguise himself in "Hieronimo's old cloak, ruff, and hat" in The Alchemist (1610), and quotes from the play in Every Man in His Humour (1598), Act I, scene iv. In Satiromastix (1601), Thomas Dekker suggests that Jonson, in his early days as an actor, himself played Hieronimo.

Allusions continue for decades after the play's origin, including references in Thomas Tomkis's Albumazar (1615), Thomas May's The Heir (1620), and as late as Thomas Rawlins's The Rebellion (c. 1638).

In modern times, T. S. Eliot quoted the title and the play in his poem The Waste Land. The play also appears in Orhan Pamuk's 2002 novel Snow.

1602 additions
The White/Pavier Q4 of 1602 added five passages, totalling 320 lines, to the existing text of the prior three quartos. The most substantial of these five is an entire scene, usually called the painter scene since it is dominated by Hieronimo's conversation with a painter; it is often designated III, xiia, falling as it does between scenes III, xii and III, xiii of the original text.

Henslowe's diary records two payments to Ben Jonson, dated 25 September 1601 and 22 June 1602, for additions to The Spanish Tragedy. Yet most scholars reject the view that Jonson is the author of the 1602 additions. The literary style of the additions is judged to be un-Jonsonian; Henslowe paid Jonson several pounds for his additions, which has seemed an excessive sum for 320 lines. And John Marston appears to parody the painter scene in his 1599 play Antonio and Mellida, indicating that the scene must have been in existence and known to audiences by that time. The five additions in the 1602 text may have been made for the 1597 revival by the Admiral's Men. Scholars have proposed various identities for the author of the revisions, including Dekker, John Webster, and Shakespeare—"Shakespeare has perhaps been the favorite in the continuing search..."

(It can seem surprising to find Shakespeare, house playwright for the Lord Chamberlain's Men, as a putative reviser of a play associated with their rival company the Admiral's Men. Yet Sir Thomas More provides a precedent of Shakespeare working as a reviser in a surprising context. It is also quite possible that the play remained, in different versions, in the repertoire of more than one company, and that the Jonson additions for Henslowe refer to the adaptation of one script while the additions in the 1602 Quarto represent those to another version, not for Henslowe but for the Chamberlain's Men. It is notable that Richard Burbage, the Chamberlain's lead actor, was a celebrated player of Hieronimo's part.)

Themes and Motifs

Revenge 
The morality of revenge has been a source of discourse for years, and as revenge is one of the key themes of the play, a lot of debate has been made over it. Hieronimo's pursuit for revenge and subsequent scheme is open to moral based judgement, but the question many scholars face is whether the responsibility and fault of Hieronimo's desire for revenge belongs solely to him. In one theory, Steven Justice proposes that the fault lies not in Hieronimo, but rather in the society at the time. It is argued that Kyd used the revenge tragedy to give body to popular images of Catholic Spain. Kyd tries to make Spain the villain in that he shows how the Spanish court gives Hieronimo no acceptable choice. The court turns Hieronimo to revenge in pursuit of justice, when in reality it is quite different.

Some critics claim that Hieronimo's attitude is what central Christian tradition calls the Old Law, the Biblical notion of an "eye for an eye". Hieronimo's passion for justice in society is revealed when he says, "For blood with blood shall, while I sit as judge, / Be satisfied, and the law discharg'd" (III.vi.35–36).

Murder and Death 
The nature of murder and death, performed and as natural phenomena, is also questioned. Smith considers how the decade in which the play is set, is relevant to its mentionings of hangings, murders, and near deaths throughout. Multiple characters are killed or nearly killed throughout the play. Horatio is hanged, Pedringano is hanged, Alexandro is nearly burnt at the stake, and Villuppo is assumed tortured and hanged. Kyd consistently refers to mutilation, torture, and death, beginning early in the play when the ghost of Don Andrea describes his stay in the underworld: "And murderers groan with never killing wounds, / And perjured wights scalded in boiling lead, / And all foul sins with torments overwhelmed" (I.i.68–70). He vividly describes in these lines as well as others the frequency of murder and torture in the underworld. Murder and death make up the tragedy theme that holds true through the last scene of the play.

Social mobility 

Another theme is social mobility—characters such as Lorenzo and Pedringano are driven by their ambition and desire for more power. Pedringano especially so as he is a servant, belonging in the lowest rank of the hierarchy. His efforts to curry favor (and go beyond his 'place') with Lorenzo leads to his resulting downfall as he is barred from social mobility, a mere tool in the end.

In addition to that, Hieronimo and his family are labeled as a "middling sort" by many scholars. Essentially the 'middle class,' Kyd establishes a situation in which conflict between Hieronimo's household and the nobility is inevitable as the middle class is seen as a threat, one that is pressing up on the aristocrats. This is evident in scenes such as the resulting competition from the 'middling sort' Horatio and Lorenzo, the King's nephew.

Scholars cite oeconomia as the philosophy Kyd is adhering to in the play.

Structure
The structure in essence is a "play within a play". The play begins with a background of why Hieronimo wants to seek revenge. He is seen as a minor character and eventually becomes the protagonist to add to the revenge plot. When he becomes the main character, the plot begins to unfold and become the revenge story that it is. Kyd incorporates the buildup to the revenge as a way to show the internal and external struggles of the characters. The actual revenge takes place during the play that Hieronimo stages, making this the climax of the play. The resolution is the explanation to the king of what has happened. The play within the play is not described until the actual play is performed, intensifying the climax, and the resolution is short due to the explanations that have already occurred.

Critics say that The Spanish Tragedy resembles a Senecan Tragedy. The separation of acts, the emphasized bloody climax, and the revenge itself, make this play resemble some of the most famous ancient plays. Kyd does acknowledge his relations to Senecan Tragedies by using Latin directly in the play but also causes Christianity to conflict with pagan ideals. We also see Kyd's use of Seneca through his referencing three Senecan plays in The Spanish Tragedy. It is said that this play was the initiator of the style for many "Elizabethan revenge tragedies, most notably Hamlet".

References

Bibliography
Editions
 Kyd, Thomas The Spanish Tragedy Broadview Edition (Peterborough, Ontario: Broadview Press, 2016). ISBN 978-1-55481-205-9. Edited by Patrick McHenry. Includes introduction and supplementary historical documents.
 Kyd, Thomas The Spanish Tragedy (London: Bloomsbury, 2013) . Edited with an introduction and notes by Clara Calvo and Jesús Tronch.
 Maus, Katharine Eisamann Four Revenge Tragedies (Oxford: Oxford University Press, 1998) . Contains The Spanish Tragedy, The Revenger's Tragedy, The Revenge of Bussy D'Ambois, and The Atheist's Tragedy.

Further reading

External links
 The Spanish Tragedie from Project Gutenberg
 The Spanish Tragedy Shorter version of the play for a modern audience
 

English Renaissance plays
Shakespeare apocrypha
1580s plays
Revenge plays
Plays by Thomas Kyd
Metafictional plays
Tragedy plays